Watermelon snow, also called snow algae, pink snow, red snow, or blood snow, is a phenomenon caused by Chlamydomonas nivalis, a species of green algae containing a secondary red carotenoid pigment (astaxanthin) in addition to chlorophyll. Unlike most species of fresh-water algae, this species appears to be cryophilic (cold-loving) and thrives in freezing water.

This type of snow is common during the summer in alpine and coastal polar regions worldwide, such as the Sierra Nevada of California. Here, at altitudes of 10,000 to 12,000 feet (3,000–3,600 m), the temperature is cold throughout the year, and so the snow has lingered from winter storms. Compressing the snow by stepping on it or making snowballs leaves it looking red. Walking on watermelon snow often results in getting bright red soles and pink trouser cuffs.

Snow algae dominates glacial biomass immediately after the onset of melting, and its pigmentation can significantly darken the surface of a glacier. This plays a substantial role in glacial melt.

History
The earliest accounts of watermelon snow are in the writings of Aristotle. Watermelon snow has puzzled mountain climbers, explorers, and naturalists for thousands of years, some speculating that it was caused by mineral deposits or oxidation products that were leached from rocks.

In May 1818, four ships sailed from England to search for the Northwest Passage and chart the Arctic coastline of North America. Severe weather made them finally turn the ships back, but the expedition made valuable contributions to science. Captain John Ross noticed crimson snow that streaked the white cliffs like streams of blood as they were rounding Cape York on the northwest coast of Greenland. A landing party stopped and brought back samples to England. The Times wrote about this discovery on December 4, 1818:

A follow-up article three days later erroneously concluded that the coloration was caused by meteoric iron deposits:

When Ross published his account of the voyage in 1818, it contained a botanical appendix by Robert Brown. In it, Brown tentatively attributed the red snow to an alga.

The phenomenon was also reported from the Scottish Highlands in the nineteenth century and subsequently recorded scientifically from a snowpatch in the Cairngorm Mountains in 1967.

Chlamydomonas nivalis and its new genus Sanguina

The name Chlamydomonas nivalis has been associated with the phenomenon of red snow for the last 200 years, yet, a latest study shows that the alga responsible for most of the red snow fields on our earth does not belong to the genus Chlamydomonas, but had to be placed in a separate, new genus, Sanguina. This genus contains two species, S. nivaloides producing red snow, and S. aurantia causing orange snow. All snow algae producing red or orange snow are actually green alga that owe their red color to a bright red carotenoid pigment, which protects the chloroplast from intense visible and also ultraviolet radiation, as well as absorbing heat, which provides the alga with liquid water as the snow melts around it. Algal blooms may extend to a depth of 25 cm (10 inches), with each cell measuring about 20 to 30 micrometers in diameter, about four times the diameter of a human red blood cell. It has been calculated that a teaspoon of melted snow contains a million or more cells. The algae sometimes accumulate in "sun cups", which are shallow depressions in the snow. The carotenoid pigment absorbs heat and as a result it deepens the sun cups, and accelerates the melting rate of glaciers and snowbanks.

During the winter months, when snow covers them, the algae become dormant. In spring, nutrients, increased levels of light and meltwater, stimulate germination. Once they germinate, the resting cells release smaller green flagellate cells which travel towards the surface of the snow. Once the flagellated cells reach the surface, they may lose their flagellae and form aplanospores, or thick-walled resting cells, or they may function as gametes, fusing in pairs to form zygotes.

Many species feed on C. nivalis/Sanguina spp., including protozoans such as ciliates, rotifers, nematodes, ice worms and springtails.

See also
Blood rain
Ice algae: algal communities encountered in annual and multi-year sea-ice.

References
Armstrong, W.P. 1999. "Watermelon Snow: A Strange Phenomenon Caused by Algal Cells of The Chlorophyta" Wayne's Word Noteworthy Plants: Aug 1998. (24 April 2006).

External links

Chlamydomonadales
Snow